Phylloteras volutellae, the conical oak gall wasp, is a species of gall wasp (family Cynipidae),
tribe Cynipini (oak gall wasps),
found in North America.

Larvae induce galls on the leaves of white oaks, including bur oak (Quecus macrocarpa) and swamp white oak (Quercus bicolor).

Description
Each gall contains a single larva and is formed on the underside of host leaves, often in clusters. The detachable gall is conical in shape and concave at the top.

The adult emerges from the gall in early January, but is otherwise undescribed.

Ecology
Inquiline species found in the galls include Synergus walshii  (Cynipidae).

References

Cynipidae
Gall-inducing insects
Oak galls